Henri Van Poucke (9 May 1906 – 2 September 1991) was a Belgian footballer. He played in two matches for the Belgium national football team in 1930.

References

External links
 

1906 births
1991 deaths
Belgian footballers
Belgium international footballers
Association footballers not categorized by position